John Paul College is a Catholic secondary school in Frankston, Victoria, Australia. It was established under the authority of the Archbishop of Melbourne and operated on his behalf by the parish priests of the five member parishes of the region — Frankston, Frankston East, Langwarrin, Chelsea and Seaford, through the College Board.

History
It was formed in 1979 by the merging of two previous colleges, Stella Maris College (girls) and Marianist College (boys).
Stella Maris began in 1968 in a large house on the property purchased from the Peninsula Golf Club in 1965 by the Sisters, Faithful Companions of Jesus. The Order took possession of the property in June 1967 and the Sisters took up residence in December of that year. The original two-storey house on the site had been erected and occupied by the Parer family in the second half of the last century, and after changing hands several times, had been in the possession of the Peninsula Golf Club since 1922. Many extensions and alterations had taken place over the years, and further conversions were required to prepare the building for the opening of the school in 1968.

In that first year, four Sisters taught the initial enrolment of ninety-nine girls. Numbers had increased to 169 by the next year and two lay teachers joined the staff. Each succeeding year saw an increase in numbers of students and staff. New classrooms, science rooms and a library were built. From 1968 until 1976, Stella Maris accepted boarders, who were housed in the residential wing of the old clubrooms.

In 1969, a committee was formed to assess the secondary education needs of Frankston. This committee, under the direction of Father Joseph P. Kealy, recommended that a boys college be established. Previously Mary Turner of Seaford had bequeathed some land in Seaford for the establishment of such a boys college. This land was subsequently sold, with the approval of the Trustees of the Turner estate, and the proceeds used to purchase  of the land belonging to Stella Maris College.

The Society of Mary (Marianists) was approached and agreement was reached that members of the Society should establish a boys college for years seven through twelve. Marianist College opened in February 1973 with 166 boys and a staff of six under the direction of Brother Donald Neff SM. Since the school building had not been completed, classes were held in St John's Church (East Frankston) and in the basement of St John's Primary School. During 1974 some classes were accommodated at St Anne's Church and Holy Family Church. Finally, all classes were brought back to the college with the completion of adequate facilities. The college continued to grow rapidly in both numbers of students and buildings to accommodate them.

After preliminary discussions in 1976, it was announced in 1977 that the two colleges would merge. During 1978, detailed planning was carried out for the merger at the beginning of 1979. During 1979, years 7 to 10 girls remained at the Stella Maris section of the college and Olsen Estate. OJ Olsen, a prominent Frankston resident, left an estate to the Church for use in the Frankston area.

In 1997, the college took possession of a set of new and refurbished facilities which have enabled the whole school to operate on one integrated campus, thus bringing to a conclusion the capital development begun in 1968.

In 2012 construction began on the schools new performing arts building and new reception offices.
In 2013 the construction of the student services office and the performing art centre was completed. 
In 2015, the construction of a new visual arts centre began.

Houses
John Paul College has four houses, they are:

D'houet (Yellow)
Olsen (Green)
Chaminade (Blue)
Turner (Red)

All of the houses are named after the founders of the college. 
The houses compete in four major competitions: Swimming, Athletics, Cross Country, and house music.

Sport 
John Paul College is a member of the Southern Independent Schools (SIS).

SIS premierships 
John Paul College has won the following SIS senior premierships.

Combined:

 Athletics (9) - 1978, 1979, 1980, 1985, 1986, 1987, 1988, 1989, 1992
 Swimming (2) - 1980, 1989

Boys:

 Basketball (6) - 2006, 2007, 2008, 2010, 2014, 2019
 Football (3) - 2000, 2004, 2005
 Soccer (2) - 2006, 2007

Girls:

 Basketball (4) - 1999, 2000, 2014, 2019
 Netball (3) - 1999, 2001, 2017
 Soccer (2) - 2012, 2018

Narnia
Narnia is spot that has cultural significance to the students of John Paul College. Narnia refers to the ‘forest’ on the school boundaries, students aren't supposed to go to said area.

It has been referred to as Narnia for several years.

Notable alumni
David Andersen, NBA Basketballer
Bailey Dale, AFL Footballer
Anthony Di Pietro, Melbourne Victory chairman
Brodie Harper, TV presenter
Anthony Harvey (footballer), AFL Footballer
Robert Harvey, AFL Footballer
Paul Johnson (Australian footballer born 1984), AFL Footballer
Jack Lonie, AFL Footballer
Marcus Marigliani, AFL Footballer
Damien McCormack, AFL Footballer
Geoff Shaw, politician
Jeff White, AFL Footballer

References

External links
John Paul College Victoria
Frankston City Website

Catholic secondary schools in Melbourne
Educational institutions established in 1979
1979 establishments in Australia
Frankston, Victoria
Buildings and structures in the City of Frankston